Daniel J. Siebert is an ethnobotanist, pharmacognosist, and author who lives in Southern California.

Siebert has studied Salvia divinorum for over twenty years and was the first person to unequivocally identify (by human bioassays in 1993) Salvinorin A as the primary psychoactive substance of Salvia divinorum. In 1998, Siebert appeared in the documentary Sacred Weeds shown in the United Kingdom. He has discussed Salvia divinorum on National Public Radio, Fox News, CNN, Telemundo and his comments have appeared in the Los Angeles Times, USA Today, and The New York Times.

In 2002, Siebert wrote a letter to the United States Congress in which he objected to bill H.R. 5607 introduced by Rep. Joe Baca (D-California) which sought to place Salvia divinorum in Schedule I of the Controlled Substances Act.

References

External links
Salvia divinorum Research and Information Center (archived; the "sagewisdom.org" website is no longer active)
 

Living people
Ethnobotanists
Year of birth missing (living people)